Burr Oak State Park is a public recreation area located  northeast of Glouster in the U.S. state of Ohio. The park sits mostly in Morgan County, with part extending into Athens County.

The state park is centered at Burr Oak Lake. The dam for the lake is federal property under the jurisdiction of the Army Corps of Engineers, and is named Tom Jenkins Dam. It was built in 1950 for flood control. The maximum depth of the lake is around thirty feet.

The lake and park are named for the burr oak tree, a variety of oak.

The park was dedicated in 1952. The park borders the Wayne National Forest and the Sunday Creek State Wildlife Area.

Activities and amenities
The park offers boating, swimming, picnicking, fishing, hunting, camping, cabins, conference center, and lodge. The Buckeye Trail passes around the lake, and the North Country Trail is coincident with the Buckeye in this location. Historically, the park has maintained open areas along roadways as wildflower meadow-type areas.

References

External links

Burr Oak State Park Ohio Department of Natural Resources 
Burr Oak State Park Map Ohio Department of Natural Resources 
Burr Oak State Park Lodge Regency Hotel Management

State parks of Ohio
Dams in Ohio
Protected areas established in 1952
1952 establishments in Ohio
Protected areas of Athens County, Ohio
Protected areas of Morgan County, Ohio
Reservoirs in Ohio
Bodies of water of Athens County, Ohio
Bodies of water of Morgan County, Ohio